Eric Towner is an American producer, writer, director and animator best known for his work on Adult Swim's Robot Chicken and Netflix's Buddy Thunderstruck.

Career
In 2005, Towner founded a studio named Stoopid Monkey with Seth Green, John Harvatine IV and Matthew Senreich. He started a show called Robot Chicken and became an executive producer for it. He soon started working on more shows like Micro Mayhem, WWE Slam City, Camp WWE and Buddy Thunderstruck. As of 2011, It was renamed Stoopid Buddy Stoodios.

Towner and Harvatine are going to direct a stop-motion/live-action hybrid named Superbago. He started 2 Robot Chicken couch gags on The Simpsons with Seth Green, John Harvatine IV, Matthew Senreich and Tom Root. His first interactive creation was Buddy Thunderstruck: The Maybe Pile.

Work
Bratz
Buddy Thunderstruck
Lego Scooby-Doo
Hot Streets
Blark and Son
Camp WWE
Changeland
The Grand Slams
Toasty Tales
Robot Chicken
SuperMansion
Friendship All-Stars
Monster Island
Sunday Paper p. 2B
The Madden 16
The Simpsons
M.O.D.O.K

References

External links
 

American animators
Living people
Stop motion animators
American film directors
Place of birth missing (living people)
American animated film directors
American animated film producers
Primetime Emmy Award winners
Year of birth missing (living people)